Leschke is a German surname. Notable people with this name include:

Erich Leschke (1887–1933), German physician
Janine Leschke, editor of academic journal Journal of European Social Policy
John Leschke, 1990 winner of the Shingo Prize
Katrin Leschke (born 1968), German mathematician

See also
Leschke syndrome, a medical condition named after Erich Leschke